Sanremo or San Remo (locally) is a city and comune on the Mediterranean coast of Liguria, in northwestern Italy. Founded in Roman times, it has a population of 55,000, and is known as a tourist destination on the Italian Riviera. It hosts numerous cultural events, such as the Sanremo Music Festival and the Milan–San Remo cycling classic.

Name

The non-univerbated spelling San Remo features on ancient maps of Liguria and maps of the Republic of Genoa, Medieval Italy, the Kingdom of Sardinia, and the Kingdom of Italy; it was used in 1924 in official documents under Mussolini. This form of the name, now superseded by Sanremo both officially and in common usage, still appears on some road signs and, more rarely, in unofficial tourist information. It has been the most widely used form of the name in English at least since the 19th century.

History

Once the Roman settlement of Matutia or Villa Matutiana, Sanremo expanded in the early Middle Ages when the population moved to the high grounds.  The nobility built a castle and the walled village of La Pigna to protect the town from Saracen raids.

At first subjected to the countship of Ventimiglia, the community later passed under the dominion of the Genoese bishops.  In 1297 they sold it to the Doria and De Mari families. It became a free town in the second half of the 15th century, after which it expanded to the Pigna hill and at Saint Syrus Cathedral. The almost perfectly preserved old village remains.

Sanremo remained independent of the Genoese Republic.  In 1753, after 20 years of fierce conflicts, it rose against Genoese hegemonical attempts. At that time Genoa built the fortress of Santa Tecla, situated on the beach near the port. The fortress was used as a prison until 2002.  It is now used as a museum.

After the French domination and the Savoy restoration in 1814, Sanremo was annexed to the Kingdom of Sardinia. From the middle of the 18th century the town grew rapidly, in part due to the development of tourism, which saw the first grand hotels built and the town extended along the coast. The Empress "Sissi" of Austria, Empress Maria Alexandrovna of Russia, and Emperor Nicholas II of Russia vacationed in Sanremo, while Swedish chemist Alfred Nobel made it his permanent home.

The San Remo conference, 19–26 April 1920, of the post-World War I Allied Supreme Council determined the allocation of Class "A" League of Nations mandates for administration of the former Ottoman-ruled lands of the Middle East by the victorious powers.  The most notable of these was the British Mandate of Palestine.

In 1972, the first public demonstration for the defense of the dignity and rights of gay people in Italy took place in Sanremo in protest against an international congress on sexual deviance organized by the catholic-inspired Italian Center for Sexology.

Economy

Sanremo's Mediterranean climate and attractive seacoast setting on the Italian Riviera make it a popular tourist destination. Besides tourism, the city is active in the production of extra virgin-grade olive oil, whose regional "designation of origin" is protected (D.O.P., Denominazione di Origine Protetta).  It is one of the agricultural commodities in western Liguria and in particular within the province of Imperia. Sanremo is known as the City of Flowers (la Città dei Fiori), this being another important aspect of the economy of the city. The nearby towns of Arma di Taggia, Bordighera and Ospedaletti are also involved in the cultivation of flowers for the international flower market of Sanremo.

The Municipal Casino, built in 1905, is an example of Art Nouveau building. The Ariston Theatre offers annual series of concerts, operas and theatre plays. The Symphony Orchestra is one of twelve symphony orchestras recognized by the state of Italy; it performs some 120 concerts throughout the year, most in the Municipal Casino's Opera Theatre.

Transportation

The city is connected to Genoa and to Ventimiglia, the border city with France, by the A10 motorway, whose last part is also known as the Autostrada dei Fiori ("Motorway of Flowers"). It has a large number of elevated sections with viaducts that give a panoramic view of the coast. The A10 joins the French A8 highway at the border between Ventimiglia and Menton. Together these national routes are part of the European route E80. The A10 motorway is a toll road, and the A8 demands a toll in sections, and some sections are free of charge.  When travelling from Italy into France, one does not pay until after the towns of Menton and Monaco.

Other roads of importance are the SS1, the "Aurelia Bis", which connects Sanremo to Taggia. This is a non-toll bypass route. The coast road is the via Aurelia or SS1 and follows the route of a Roman road. This can be heavily congested when it passes through towns, as it has only one lane in either direction for most of way around Sanremo.  A trolleybus line along the via Aurelia links Sanremo with both Taggia and Ventimiglia.

The closest airport to Sanremo is in France, the Côte d'Azur International Airport in Nice, 45 minutes away by car. The railway connects the city to the other Ligurian cities like Imperia, Genoa and to Nice, Milan, Turin and Rome.

The railway line used to be along the coast, running close to the sea, and providing a view for travellers.  The line has been moved further north and underground, which allows for faster trains; Sanremo railway station was relocated next to the City Hall. The city has refurbished the old railway line and converted it into a bike route and pedestrian area. There are several bike hire kiosks along the route and a choice of beaches to visit in either direction from San Remo. The path stretches  between Ospedaletti in the west and San Lorenzo al Mare in the east.

Geography

Climate 
Sanremo experiences a hot-summer Mediterranean climate (Köppen climate classification Csa).

Culture

Music festival

The Ariston Theatre hosts the celebrated annual Sanremo Music Festival, which has been held in the city since 1951. This festival inspired the Eurovision Song Contest, which started in 1956, and has often been used to select the Italian entry for the European contest. The internationally notable song "Nel blu, dipinto di blu", popularly known as "Volare", was performed at this festival for the first time by Domenico Modugno in 1958. The festival is so popular among Italians that it is often referred to simply as "Il Festival" (The Festival). Other events include the Tenco Prize (autumn), a song contest for authors dedicated to the memory of Luigi Tenco; the Flowers Parade in January/February in which every city of the Italian Riviera presents an original composition of flowers displayed on a Carnival/Mardi-Gras style moving car; and the summer Firework International Contest in the second week of August also called Ferragosto.

Cuisine
The culinary specialities of Sanremo and environs include Sardenara, Focaccia, Focaccia alle Cipolle, Torta Verde, Farinata and Taggiasca olives.

Gambling
The Sanremo Casino (Casino Municipale di Sanremo) opened in 1905 and has operated continuously since then with the exception of the years of World War II.  For much of its history, the casino was tolerated or granted exceptions to Italian gambling laws in order to allow the resort to compete with the casino towns in nearby France and Monaco.

Sanremo hosts an annual poker tournament as part of the European Poker Tour. The city is widely accepted as the origin of the five-card stud variant telesina.

Sports

The Rallye Sanremo is a rally competition that was part of the FIA World Rally Championship from 1973 to 2003, when it was replaced by Rally d'Italia Sardegna on the island of Sardinia, in hosting the Italian round of the WRC. It is now part of European Rally Championship. Formerly a mixed surface event (tarmac and gravel), the rally has later been an all-tarmac event and takes place around the mountains.

Sanremo is the finish of the classic Milan–San Remo cycle race. It is considered to be a "monument" – one of the five most important one-day races of the cycling season. Milan – San Remo is traditionally held in March and is one of the first major fixtures on the cycling season.

The most important local football club is the Sanremese that has played also in Serie B and in Serie C.

Notable people
Mercurial Italian tennis player Fabio Fognini.
The Venerable Giorgio Baldassarre Oppezzi, a monk who died in 1525, and whose body was later discovered to be incorrupt, is buried here in the church of Santa Maria degli Angeli.
Italian singer Luigi Tenco died in Sanremo shortly after his performance at the 1967 Italian Song Festival.
Empress Maria Alexandrovna, consort of Alexander II of Russia, spent the winter of 1874 in Sanremo and as a gift to the city she donated the palms along the seaside walk of Corso Imperatrice (Empress Avenue).
Alfred Nobel bought a villa in Sanremo in 1891 and died there in 1896. Since 2002 it has housed a permanent exhibit on the most important discoveries of the 19th century including the research interests of Nobel himself. Sanremo continues to maintain its ties with Nobel, long after his death. Each 10 December (the date that Nobel died in 1896) large quantities of flowers sent by the province of Imperia, the city of Sanremo and the Board for Tourist Promotion of the Riviera dei fiori adorn the annual Nobel Prize Award Ceremony and Banquet in Stockholm.
Italian writer Italo Calvino spent his youth in Sanremo and many of his novels, including Il Barone Rampante, are reminiscent of his attachment to the city.
Edward James, British poet known for his patronage of the surrealist art movement, died in Sanremo on December 2, 1984.
Edward Lear, English artist, illustrator and writer known for his nonsense poetry and limericks, lived and died in Sanremo. His tombstone is in the Foce Cemetery.
The Italian actor and comedian Carlo Dapporto was born in Sanremo and became a household name in post-war Italy.
The Sicilian playwright and Nobel Prize winner Luigi Pirandello lived in Sanremo in 1933–34 and was appointed artistic director of the Casino.
The writer Tobias Smollett stayed a few days in Sanremo in 1765 and described it thus: "St. Remo is a pretty considerable town, well-built upon the declivity of a gently rolling hill...There is very little plain ground in this neighbourhood; but the hills are covered with oranges, lemons, pomegranates and olives....The women of St. Remo are much more handsome and better tempered than those of Provence." Travels Through France and Italy (1766).
Italian director and cinematographer Mario Bava was born in Sanremo in 1914.
Italian-born sculptor Giuseppe Moretti lived in Sanremo in his final years and died here in February 1935. Moretti designed the world's largest cast iron statue, of the Roman god Vulcan (56 ft or 17 m), which stands atop Red Mountain in Birmingham, Alabama (USA). The statue is the symbol of the city.
Italian progressive-impressionist painter Demetrio (Dino) Rosa lived in Sanremo during his youth and part of his adult life.
Mehmed VI, the last Sultan of the Ottoman Empire, died in Sanremo on May 16, 1926.
Fausto Zonaro, last Court Painter to the Ottoman Empire, died in San Remo on the 19th of July 1929. He was buried with public honours in La Foce cemetery. On his gravestone, underneath an Ottoman tughra, it states that Zonaro was the court painter of the Ottoman Empire.
Juan Manuel Fangio won his first European Grand Prix in Sanremo-Ospedaletti in 1949.
Mohammad Ali Shah Qajar, Shah of Persia from 1907 to 1909, died in Sanremo on April 5, 1925.
Alex Liddi, who was born in Sanremo, became the first native Italian to play Major League Baseball, in 2011 with the Seattle Mariners.
Giovanni Ermiglia, Italian nonviolent activist.
Giotto Maraghini, Italian admiral (1882–1946).

Twin towns – sister cities

Sanremo is twinned with:
 Atami, Japan (1976)
 Helsingør, Denmark
 Karlskoga, Sweden

See also
Sanremo railway station
Sanremo railway station (1872)
U.S. Sanremese Calcio
Sanremo Festival

References

External links

 Sanremo official website
 Sanremo Festival
 Saint Sirus's Cathedral
 Video and events from Sanremo
 New Sanremo cycle path
 Sanremo images - old port and sanctuary
 All about the events in Sanremo

 
Cities and towns in Liguria
Coastal towns in Liguria
Italian Riviera
Seaside resorts in Italy
Spa towns in Italy